Lava Pixel V1 is a dual SIM Android smartphone, manufactured and marketed by Lava International, in India, which is the second generation Android One device by this company. It was released in July 2015. Being a device of the Android One series its software is same as instructed by Google i.e. Stock Android, and will get OTA updates as quickly as the Nexus devices. The device was launched exclusively on Flipkart and was sold for Rs. 9990 in India.

Android (operating system) devices
Mobile phones introduced in 2015